8 Fossgate is a historic building in the city centre of York, in England.

The oldest part of the building is the front block, facing onto Fossgate.  The three-storey timber framed block dates from the early 17th century, and was originally only one room deep.  In the late 17th century, it was extended to the rear, and its former rear wall was rebuilt in brick.  In about 1700, a separate two-storey brick house was constructed at the rear of the site, incorporating what is believed to be part of the wall of the York Carmelite Friary at its base, where it faces onto Black Horse Passage.  In the 19th century, a long, two-storey block was built to connect the two existing buildings.

The building was Grade II listed in 1954.  For more than 60 years until 2020, it was occupied by Connollys Homestyle.

The front of the building is two bays wide, and its upper floors are jettied.  The timber framing is visible, and is infilled with plaster.  The ground floor has a late 19th century shopfront.  Inside, one first floor room has late 17th century panelling and a blocked fireplace, and there is also a staircase of this date.

References

Fossgate
Fossgate 8
Timber framed buildings in Yorkshire